Makaryev Sobor's were two Local Council meetings of the Russian Orthodox Church, convened in 1547 and 1549 by Macarius, Metropolitan of Moscow, for the purpose of canonization of Russian saints. For this reason, the period Makarevskuyu cathedrals called "new era of miracle workers". According to the church historian AV Kartasheva, Metropolitan Macarius called these churches for the purpose of canonization Russian saints, based on the understanding of the "special position of the Russian Church in the Universe" and " fait accompli political unification of Russia".  

Makary cathedrals finally formed canonization procedure for solving the conciliar bishops and with the approval of the primate of the Church. Initially, researchers believed that only consolidated data Cathedrals liturgical celebration of the saints, the former previously Locally, in the church-wide scale. The notion that made a number of cathedrals canonization of saints, is available in Metropolitan Macarius (Bulgakov), but the first time that they were intended only canonized saints, wrote historian Vasily Klyuchevsky. Modern scholars believe that these churches were rather liturgical than kanonizatsionnymi - that is, had not intended to glorify the new saints as their veneration known in dosoborny period and systematization of data hagiography of saints and their approval hymnography.

References

Russian Orthodox Church in Russia
1547 in Russia
1549 in Russia
History of the Russian Orthodox Church